The Little Swanport River is a perennial river located on the east coast of Tasmania, Australia.

Course and features
The Little Swanport River forms a key part of the  within Little Swanport water catchment. It is here that the Little Swanport River meets the sea and land use is more diverse with large coastal grazing properties, residential/holiday settlements, tourist accommodation, and olive and oyster farming enterprises. The mouth of the Little Swanport River (estuary) is a popular spot for recreational fishing and other seaside holiday activities. It supports several successful oyster farming enterprises.

The river forms the most northern border of the Pembroke Land District.

In the colonial period of the early 1800s the Lisdillon salt works used the Little Swanport River.

See also

References

Rivers of Tasmania
East Coast Tasmania